Todrick Hall (born April 4, 1985) is an American singer, choreographer, and YouTuber. He gained national attention on the ninth season of the televised singing competition American Idol. Following this, he amassed a huge following on YouTube with viral videos including original songs, parodies, and skits. A documentary series about his video-making process titled Todrick aired on MTV in 2015.

Starting with season eight, Hall became a resident choreographer and occasional judge on RuPaul's Drag Race. From 2016 to 2017, Hall starred as Lola in Kinky Boots on Broadway. Later in 2017, he began appearances as Billy Flynn in Chicago on Broadway and the West End.

As a singer-songwriter he has released four studio albums, including the visual albums Straight Outta Oz (2016) and Forbidden (2018). In 2020 he released an EP, Quarantine Queen, in response to the COVID-19 pandemic featuring "Mask, Gloves, Soap, Scrub", and was the international host of Global Pride 2020.

Early life and education 
Todrick Hall was born on April 4, 1985, in Plainview, Texas, a farming community in the state's panhandle. He was raised by a single mother until she married when he was a teen, when he gained a brother and stepfather. Later the family would move to Dallas.

As a child, he adored The Wizard of Oz. As an adult, he would create Oz, the Musical; the pop song The Wizard of Ahhhs featuring the pop a cappella quintet Pentatonix; and the visual album and tour Straight Out of Oz. An elementary teacher in Dallas led Hall toward the arts, including theater, the orchestra, and ballet.

Hall is gay, and came out to his family when he was 15. At age 16, he began performing on weekends at the amusement park Six Flags Over Texas; it was the first time he combined singing and dancing. He also performed on cruises with Royal Caribbean, Holland America Line, and at Walt Disney Parks and Resorts. Hall has said that his work ethic comes from the lack of opportunities he had in the entertainment industry as a black gay man.

Career

2006–2010: Broadway, YouTube, American Idol 
When Hall was twenty he auditioned for the Broadway production of The Color Purple with Oprah Winfrey and Fantasia Barrino. He was cast in the ensemble, and as understudy for the role of Harpo. Barrino rose to fame as the winner of the third season of the reality singing competition American Idol, and working with her would inspire Hall to later audition for the show as well. After The Color Purple he performed in Memphis: The Musical and touring productions of Beauty and the Beast, Radio City Christmas Spectacular featuring the Rockettes, and Hairspray.

Hall relocated to Los Angeles, eventually living in a four-bedroom "nondescript three-story home in the Hollywood Hills". He joined the video-sharing platform YouTube in May 2006, and made over 300 videos in the next five years. His first video, filmed while still living in Texas, was "a hilarious clip of him singing his order to a McDonald's drive-through speaker (complete with backup singers)". The video has since received over ten million views. In 2008 he uploaded a video of a performance of "Hard to Say Goodbye," which boosted his subscribers to two million. YouTube became a full-time pursuit for Hall in 2011. He says the platform showcases "how I can write a song, create the concepts, execute them, direct, choreograph and do hair and makeup" as well as perform. Some of his popular videos were the basis of later concert tours like "Twerk Du Soleil" and the "Toddlerz Ball."

In August 2009, Hall auditioned for the ninth season of American Idol in Dallas, Texas. He sang a self-composed song mentioning the judges – Simon Cowell, Randy Jackson, Kara DioGuardi, and guest judge Joe Jonas – to make his case for inclusion in the program. Years later, reflecting on his Idol experiences, Hall said his "fondest memory" was the audition song. All four approved of his participation; he went into Hollywood week and eventually the semi-finals. In the Top 24, he sang Kelly Clarkson's "Since U Been Gone", and in the Top Twenty performed Tina Turner's "What's Love Got to Do with It". He was eliminated in the Top 16 on March 11, 2010, after his rendition of Queen's "Somebody to Love;" he was one of four contestants eliminated in that round, and thus ranked between 13th and 16th overall. Judge Simon Cowell dismissively told Hall he "wouldn't amount to anything beyond a Broadway actor". Later Hall stated that he regretted hiding his sexuality on the show: he had a girl wait for his post-audition walk outside with his golden ticket.

In August 2010, Hall returned to Broadway in the musical Memphis. Hall feels, in contrast to producing shows and managing staff, that his Broadway work was less stressful as he was an employee who did his job then was done. As a producer he was responsible for every facet of production.

2011–2013: Career growth and YouTube fame
Hall's audience has grown considerably: as of June 2019, Hall currently has 3.1 million subscribers on YouTube, and as of March 2018, his videos have been viewed 531.9 million times. Hall's videos include several of his own original songs and music videos, choreographed flash mobs for Ariana Grande and Beyoncé performed in an actual Target store, the latter of which Beyoncé personally recognized Hall for, musical collaborations with Pentatonix, and personal updates.

In May 2011, he released a video audition for the third season of Glee titled "I Wanna Be on Glee", for possible inclusion in the show. Though the video was popular, Hall was not cast in the program.
In November 2013, Virgin America produced a pop-music safety video directed by Jon M. Chu with music by Jean-Yves Decornet. Hall wrote the song and lyrics and starred in the video. In December 2013, Hall released a Christmas album entitled Dear Santa, with covers of "This Christmas" and "Sleigh Bells", produced by wiidope as well as original songs "So Cold" and "SplitsOnXmasTrees".

Hall did a choreographed flash mob in a Target store to Beyoncé's "End of Time" prompting her to hire Hall as a choreographer on her roller-disco video, "Blow" which came out in November 2013.

2014–2015: Pop Star High and Todrick docuseries
From April 1 to May 13, 2014, Hall released an eight episode web series on his YouTube channel called Pop Star High. The series takes place in a world where all of the most famous Pop Stars of our day all went to high school together. The series portrays and parodies pop stars like Lady Gaga, Beyoncé, Britney Spears, Nicki Minaj, Christina Aguilera, Justin Timberlake, Taylor Swift, Ne-Yo, Kanye West, Eminem, Jay-Z, and Tyga, and draws on the tropes of high school comedy movies. The soundtrack for the series was released on April 1, 2014.

On October 22, 2014, MTV announced Todrick, a docuseries following Hall, would premiere in 2015. On December 20, 2014, Hall produced and appeared in a commercial for the series and featured other celebrities' holiday wishes. Eight episodes of the docuseries were ordered and aired throughout 2015. The soundtrack for the show was released on October 13, 2015. In October 2015, he was picked as Elvis Duran's Artist of the Month and was featured on NBC's Today show hosted by Kathie Lee Gifford and Hoda Kotb and broadcast nationally where he performed live his single "Wind It Up".

In February 2015, he was the first artist featured on VH1's Huge on the Tube series.

2016–2017: Straight Outta Oz, Kinky Boots, and RuPaul's Drag Race

Hall first appeared as a guest judge on the eighth season of RuPaul's Drag Race for an episode which featured a Wizard of Oz-inspired challenge and aired April 11, 2016; they did not know his lifelong passion for The Wonderful Wizard of Oz. Hall reappeared as a full-time judge for RuPaul's Drag Race: All Stars 3 later in 2016 and again for the ninth season aired throughout 2017. Along with Drag Race, Hall frequently appeared on Logo TV's game show Gay for Play Game Show Starring RuPaul alongside other celebrities.

On June 23, 2016, Todrick self-released his second album, Straight Outta Oz. The album is a visual concept album that uses the imagery of The Wizard of Oz to explore Todrick's own life and rise to fame. He was inspired to create the project after seeing Disney's Zootopia, Lin-Manuel Miranda's Hamilton, and Beyoncé's visual album Lemonade. The album has seventeen songs, the tour had over twenty; it took about six weeks to write, and then filming the videos happened in two weeks. The project's first video was posted to YouTube on June 23, 2016. The videos had cameos from Kim Chi, Bob the Drag Queen, Willam Belli, Joseph Gordon-Levitt, Nicole Scherzinger, Pentatonix, Perez Hilton, and Amber Riley. "Color" ruminates on his first boyfriend, a handsome Londoner, "the first to really know me." Hall announced the Straight Outta Oz Tour to promote the album which originally ran between July 7, and August 12, 2016 in the United States and Canada. The album debuted in ITunes Top Ten Pop Album Chart after its release in late June 2016.

The Straight Outta Oz Tour was interrupted by Hall's casting in the Broadway musical Kinky Boots. They offered the lead in Kinky Boots "without even auditioning, because they felt my story was so similar to that of Lola's", a drag queen cabaret performer. Hall's performance was well received by critics. He performed 155 shows from November 1, 2016, to March 1, 2017.

The Straight Outta Oz Tour was revived in 2017 and ran between March 30, and June 5, in various North American, European, and Australian locations. It was accompanied by an expanded deluxe edition that included songs that were featured on the tour but not on the original version of the album. Additionally, the album included an extended version and new video for "Wrong Bitch" featuring Bob the Drag Queen, and a rerecorded version of Todrick's previous single "Low" featuring RuPaul. In August 2017, he had a cameo as a back-up dancer in the music video for Taylor Swift's song, "Look What You Made Me Do"; the two had become friends in 2015, and would collaborate on several projects.

From November 30, 2017, to January 14, 2018, played Billy Flynn in a limited engagement role in Chicago. During his tenure, the show had its best-grossing week in its 21-year Broadway history.

In December he released the documentary film Behind the Curtain about the production behind Straight Outta Oz filmed in conjunction with AwesomenessTV who had released a successful documentary about another gay YouTuber Tyler Oakley. It was screened in select theaters and later released on home video. Later that month he had a guest appearance in the Bob's Burgers Season 8 episode "The Bleakening" as drag queen Miss Triple-Xmas (or Cleavage to Beaver) performing the song "Twinkly Lights". He also released a medley of covers of songs from the Pitch Perfect film series that was featured on the Pitch Perfect 3 Special Edition soundtrack.

2018–2020: Forbidden, Haus Party, The Greatest Dancer, and Quarantine Queen
In March 2018 he released his new visual album follow-up to Straight Outta Oz called Forbidden. To promote the album, Hall embarked on Forbidden: The Tour across the United States, Europe, Asia, Australia, and New Zealand.

In May 2019, Hall revealed that he will be releasing a trilogy of extended plays to be released across the next six months. The first EP, Haus Party, Pt. 1, with its first single "Glitter" was released May 16, 2019. The EP also contained the hit "Nails, Hair, Hips, Heels", with a remix featuring Ciara. The EPs were supported by the Haus Party World Tour. Part Two was originally planned to be released in July 2019 but was delayed to September 19, 2019. It was supported by the singles "Wig", "Fag", and "Dripeesha" (the latter featuring Tiffany Haddish). Part Three was released in February 2021.

On June 17, 2019, Hall appeared in and co-executive produced the music video for singer-songwriter Taylor Swift's song "You Need to Calm Down". Hall also helped recruit guests for the cameo-filled video. In June 2019, Hall announced that he will be returning to Broadway to play Ogie Anhorn in the musical Waitress opposite fellow YouTuber Colleen Ballinger. In August 2019 he joined the panel of Dance Captains for the second series of The Greatest Dancer alongside the other Dance Captains Cheryl, Oti Mabuse and Matthew Morrison. From November 2019 to January 2020 Hall will play the lead, Billy Flynn, in the West End version of the musical Chicago.

In February 2020, Hall released a song for Disneyland's new twice daily parade, called "Magic Happens". Hall "learned to dance by watching Disney parades". On April 27, 2020, Hall announced on social media that he had spent the past week writing and recording an EP entitled Quarantine Queen (themed around the COVID-19 pandemic). The album was released on April 29, 2020. In May 2020 Hall signed with CAA Management. On November 26, 2020, Hall released a live album of the Haus Party world tour recorded in Atlanta, alongside a full video recording for free on YouTube.

2021: Femuline
On February 12, 2021, Hall released the third volume of the Haus Party trilogy after being delayed sixteen months past its original release date. On June 8, 2021, Hall released his fourth studio album, Femuline, which was preceded by the singles "Boys in the Ocean" and "Rainin' Fellas". The album is inspired by gay pride and features appearances from Chaka Khan, Tyra Banks, Brandy, Nicole Scherzinger and Ts Madison.

In September 2021, Hall and Samsung teamed up for a remix video of his breakthrough single, "Nails, Hair, Hips, Heels," centered around the new Samsung Galaxy Z Flip3 foldable smartphone. The reworked lyrics -- "Flip, Fold, Snap, Clack"—reference the phone's ability to flip up and fold down.

In December 2021, Hall competed in season six of The Masked Singer as "Bull" and finished in second place.

In January 2022, it was announced that Hall would be participating in the third season of Celebrity Big Brother as a contestant. He made it into the final three and then placed runner up for the season. During his stint in the show, he was widely criticized for his comments regarding Shanna Moakler which viewers and critics alike identified as body shaming. Additionally, Hall received backlash following his defamation attempts of Chris Kirkpatrick.

2022: Algorhythm
On June 1, 2022, Hall released his fifth album, Algorhythm.

Artistry 

Hall is a baritenor with a soulful, expressive voice, including falsetto; in addition to a singer, Hall is also a rapper. The genre of his works include R&B, pop, hip hop, neo-soul, funk, and musical theater. Many of his lyrics include elements of social commentary, such as racism, gun violence in and against black communities in "Water Guns" (featuring Jordin Sparks), acceptance of interracial relationships in "Color" (featuring Jay Armstrong Johnson), and queer culture; Hall writes and produces much of his own music with WiiDope & Jeeve (Ducornet). Hall also posts musical tributes to his favorite musical artists such as Beyoncé, Rihanna, and Taylor Swift. These tributes feature elaborately-produced mashups of the artists' songs sung by Hall. Many are done in his "signature split-screen a cappella style" showing four Halls singing together.
 
Hall's music videos often feature extravagant production value not typically associated with artists outside major labels. Hall's videos often include bespoke costumes and urban fashion, elaborate sets, and extensive choreography, much of which is designed or created by Hall himself. Some of the productions are mini-musicals like his renditions of "The Wizard of Oz" and "Singin' in Rain". He frequently directs his own videos as well. The "acting is freewheeling, the tunes catchy, the writing sharp". As part of his style, many of Hall's music videos include drag as a central component, either featuring Hall in drag himself or famous drag queens including RuPaul, Bob the Drag Queen, Willam Belli, and Alaska Thunderfuck, among others. He makes regular appearances on RuPaul's Drag Race as a resident choreographer and as a judge on the show.

Personal life
Hall came out as gay at the age of fifteen, and has stated a desire to be a role model for LGBTQ people and people of color.

Hall announced a relationship with model David Borum via an Instagram post in May 2021.

Allegations of professional and sexual misconduct
In 2019, several former dancers and collaborators on Hall's YouTube videos and visual albums accused him of never compensating them for their work. Hall has denied these allegations.

Also in 2019, Hall's former assistant shared documents alleging Hall was involved in a sexual harassment lawsuit, and that he witnessed predatory behavior. The allegations were reiterated in 2022 following Hall's controversial appearance on Celebrity Big Brother.

Selected videography

2010–11

 It Gets Better (original song)
 McDonald's Drive Thru Song
 Beyoncé End of Time Flash Mob
 I Wanna Be On Glee (original song)
 We Found Love (cover) (duet with Siri)
 Without U (cover) (duet with Tori Kelly)

2012–13 

 Once Upon a Crime (Episodes 1–4)
 Keeping Up with the KarTRASHYans (3 episodes)
 Grown Woman (Beyoncé/Disney Parody)
 Beauty and the Beat (Parody of Belle)
 How The Grinch Stole Crenshaw
 Dear Santa (original song)
 Disney Dudez (feat. IM5) (Disney Tribute)
 Todrick Hall's The Wizard of Ahhhs feat. Pentatonix
 Hold On, We're Going Home (cover)
 The Hungry Games (The Hunger Games parody)
 Mean Gurlz (Mean Girls parody)
 Spell Block Tango (parody of Cell Block Tango with Disney characters)
 Beyoncé (2013) – choreographer – 
 Beyonce (2013) -actor [uncredited] – "Superpower"

2014

  (8 episodes)
 Once Upon a Crime (Episodes 5 & 6)
 Opening Act for the Nickelodeon Kids Choice Awards
 Twerking in the Rain (parody of Singing in the Rain)
 Mary Poppin-Dem-Pills (Mary Poppins parody)
 Cinderfella
 Mean Boys (Mean Girls parody)
 All That Azz (parody of All That Jazz)
 Bridesmaidz 2 (Bridesmaidz parody)
 Weavegirlz (Dreamgirls parody)
 Disney Dudez 2 (feat. IM5) (Disney Tribute)
 Snow White and the Seven Thugs
 Freaks Like Me (feat. the cast of Dance Moms)
 Disney Dudez 3 (feat. IM5) (Disney Tribute)
 #BandCamp (with IM5) (6 episodes)
 Cell Black Django (parody of Cell Block Tango)
 Alice in WeHoLand
 Splits on Christmas Trees
 Bitch Perfect (Pitch Perfect parody)

2015

 DRIVE (original song)
 90s Disney (feat. Shoshana Bean)
 4 Beyoncé (Tribute for Beyoncé)
 4 Gaga (Tribute for Lady Gaga)
 4 Rihanna (Tribute for Rihanna)
 4 Taylor (Tribute for Taylor Swift)
 Beauty and the Beat Boots (Parody of Belle)
 Bitch Better Have My Money (cover)
 Pretty Boys (parody of Pretty Girls) (Public Service Announcement)
 Evolution of Disney (Disney tribute)
 Mickey Minaj (Nicki Minaj/Disney tribute)
 Pentatodrix (Pentatonix tribute)
 Invisible (Cover)
 Low (original song)
 What They Say  (original song) (feat. Joseph Gordon-Levitt)
 Monday Nights (MTV)
 The Birthday Dance  (original song) (MTV)
 Who Let the Freaks Out (Original Song) (MTV)
 Haterz (Original Song) (MTV)
 Epic Love (Original Song) (MTV)
 Wind It Up (Original Song) (MTV)
 Titaniqua (Titanic parody) (MTV)
 You Unfollowed Me (Original Song) (MTV) (feat. Joseph Gordon-Levitt)
 Hocus Broke-us (Hocus Pocus parody)
 Dem Cakes Tho (Original Song) (MTV)
 Youngblood (from Jem and the Holograms) (original song)
 Peter Perry (Katy Perry/Peter Pan parody)(MTV)

2016

You Wish (2 episodes)(GoFundMe Project)
Theme Queens (feat. Frankie Grande)
4 Miranda (Tribute for Miranda Sings)
Hakuna Truvada (parody of Hakuna Matata) (Public Service Announcement)
DANCE (feat. Abby Lee Dance Company)
Steak and Eggs (original song)
4 Ariana (Tribute for Ariana Grande)
Taylor in Wonderland (Taylor Swift/Alice in Wonderland parody) (feat. Maddie Ziegler)
15 Ways to Not Get HIV #HIVBEATS
Britney and the Beast (Britney Spears/Beauty and the Beast parody)
Straight Outta Oz
Purse First (music video by Bob the Drag Queen)

2017

4 the 90s
4 the 2000s
Get Out 2 (Get Out parody)
Once Upon a Crime (Episode 7)
Look What You Made Me Do (music video by Taylor Swift) (dancer)
 "Come Together" (Justice League: YouTube Edition)
4 Pitch Perfect 3 (sponsored video)
4 The Greatest Showman (sponsored video)

2018

Medicine (Kelly Clarkson cover)
Forbidden
Making of Forbidden (6 episodes)
4 High School Musical (High School Musical tribute)
4 the 90's
Glitter  (original song) (sponsored by Google)
Seasons of Love (cover) (sponsored by Rent Live)
All I Care About Is Love (from Chicago)

2019

Epic Beyoncé Lion King Mashup
Gay Bring It On Parody
Ariana x Rihanna Mashup
Mean Girls x Dreamgirls mashup
 You Need to Calm Down (music video by Taylor Swift) (dancer/co-executive producer)
 Please Me X Mary Poppins Mashup & Parody (with Julia Aka)
 Nails, Hair, Hips, Heels (original song)
 I Like Boys (original song)
 Wig (original song)
 Fag (original song)
 Dripeesha (featuring Tiffany Haddish) (original song)

2020

"Malibu" (At Home Edition)
"Mask, Gloves, Soap, Scrubs" (Official Video)
"Mask, Gloves, Soap, Scrubs" (Lyric Video)
"Mask, Gloves, Soap, Scrubs" (Official Fan Music Video)
"Glitter" (Official Lyric Video)
"Y.A.S." (TikTok Fan Video)
"Y.A.S." (Official Video)
Haus Party World Tour LIVE
4 Merch | Everything Musg Go!
"Boss Bitch"
"Nails, Hair, Hips, Heels" Live
Bells, Bows, Gifts, Trees

Filmography

Discography

 Somebody's Christmas (2010)
 Straight Outta Oz (2016)
 Forbidden (2018)
 Femuline (2021)
 Algorhythm (2022)
 Jim (2023)

Tours
Twerk du Soleil (2013)
Twerk the Halls (2014)
Toddlerz Ball (2015)
Straight Outta Oz (2016–2017)
Forbidden: The Tour (2018)
Haus Party Tour (2019 & 2021)
The Femuline World Tour (2022)

 Awards and recognition 

 2014, named to Forbes' 30 Under 30 list.
 2015, Business Insider''s list of the "Hottest YouTube Stars Alive".
 2016 Streamy Awards, Music Award for Breakthrough Artist, winner.
 2019 MTV Video Music Award for collaboration on Taylor Swift's "You Need to Calm Down", winner as executive producer.

Notes

References

External links

1985 births
Living people
21st-century American male actors
21st-century American singers
20th-century African-American male singers
American choreographers
American Idol participants
Singers from Texas
Gay singers
Gay songwriters
LGBT YouTubers
American LGBT singers
American LGBT songwriters
American gay actors
American gay musicians
LGBT African Americans
LGBT people from Texas
21st-century American male singers
Male actors from Texas
YouTube channels launched in 2008
Songwriters from Texas
YouTubers from Texas
African-American choreographers
African-American songwriters
20th-century American LGBT people
21st-century LGBT people
21st-century African-American male singers
American male songwriters
Participants in American reality television series
American gay writers